The 1917 Ealing by-election was held on 30 April 1917.  The by-election was held due to the incumbent Conservative MP, Herbert Nield, becoming Recorder of York.  It was retained by Nield.

References

Ealing by-election
Ealing,1917
20th century in Middlesex
Ealing by-election
Ealing,1917
Unopposed by-elections to the Parliament of the United Kingdom (need citation)